History, Mystery & Prophesy is a studio album by Jamaican record producer and singer Lee "Scratch" Perry, released on April 21, 1984, by Island Records. The album was recorded at a time when Perry had had a long-standing grudge with Island Records, and features his trademark dub reggae sound mixed with synth-pop.

Critical reception

In a retrospective review for AllMusic, critic John Dougan wrote of the album, "Perry's weakest Island/Mango release. All the rough edges are gone, and Perry's berserk charm is in short supply." Adding that "Still, because it's Perry, there are tracks to recommend ("Heads of Government" being the most notable), but there are plenty better Perry records to be had."

Track listing

Personnel
Credits are adapted from the History, Mystery & Prophesy liner notes.

Musicians
 Lee "Scratch" Perry – lead vocals
 Harold Barney – backing vocals
 Pat Carey – backing vocals
 Abigail Charlon – backing vocals

Technical
 Lee "Scratch" Perry – producer; engineer
 Errol Thompson – engineer; mixing
 The Upsetters – engineer
 Andy Lyden – engineer
 Steven Stanley – engineer
 Kendal Stubbs – engineer
 Sean Burrows – assistant engineer
 Frank Gibson – assistant engineer

References

External links
 

1984 albums
Lee "Scratch" Perry albums
Albums produced by Lee "Scratch" Perry
Dub albums
Island Records albums